Akbarabad-e Bahari (also Romanized as Akbarābād-e Baḥarī; also known as Akbarābād) is a village in Takab Rural District, Shahdad District, Kerman County, Kerman Province, Iran. At the 2006 census, its population was 118, in 34 families.

References 

Populated places in Kerman County